NuWay is a fast-food restaurant based in Wichita, Kansas. Opened July 4, 1930, the restaurant soon became famous for its loose-meat sandwiches and root beer. The sandwiches are similar to what is known in the Upper Midwest as tavern sandwiches and the ones served at that region's Maid-Rite restaurant chain.

History

NuWay began serving loose-meat sandwiches in 1930. It began with one location on West Douglas on the west side of Wichita, Kansas. With the success of the location it soon grew to the size of six locations. In July 2010, Wichita's NuWay celebrated 80 years in business.

See also
 List of hamburger restaurants

References

External links
NuWay website

Restaurants in Kansas
Fast-food hamburger restaurants
Restaurants established in 1930